The Harderkulm (also referred to as Harder Kulm, since the top station of the funicular is called that way) is a viewpoint at  in the Berner Oberland region of Switzerland, overlooking the towns of Interlaken and Unterseen.

The viewpoint belongs to the municipality of Unterseen in the canton of Bern with the slopes shared between the municipalities of Unterseen and Interlaken. The viewpoint offers extensive views across Interlaken, the alluvial land called Bödeli, and southwards up the valley of the river Lütschine to the high peaks of the Bernese Alps, whilst itself forming part of the Emmental Alps.

Harderkulm is occupied by the castle-like Bergrestaurant Harder Kulm and adjoining observation platform.

Funicular 

The Harderbahn, a tourist funicular, links Interlaken with an upper station some five minutes walk from the restaurant. The funicular journey takes eight minutes.

References

External links

Bernese Alps
Mountains of the Alps
Mountains of Switzerland
One-thousanders of Switzerland
Mountains of the canton of Bern